{{Infobox election
| election_name = 2004 United States Senate election in Louisiana
| country = Louisiana
| flag_year = 2006
| type = presidential
| ongoing = no
| previous_election = 1998 United States Senate election in Louisiana
| previous_year = 1998
| next_election = 2010 United States Senate election in Louisiana
| next_year = 2010
| election_date = November 2, 2004
| image_size = 125x136px
| image1 = David_Vitter_official_portrait.jpg
| nominee1 = David Vitter
| party1 = Republican Party (United States)
| popular_vote1 = 943,014 
| percentage1 = 51.03%
| image2 = Chrisjohn.jpg
| nominee2 = Chris John
| party2 = Democratic Party (United States)
| popular_vote2 = 542,150
| percentage2 = 29.34%
| image3 = John Neely Kennedy official portrait (cropped).jpg
| nominee3 = John Kennedy
| party3 = Democratic Party (United States)
| popular_vote3 = 275,821
| percentage3 = 14.92%
| map_image = 2004 United States Senate election in Louisiana results map by parish.svg
| map_size = 300px
| map_caption = Parish results Vitter:     John:   
| title = U.S. Senator
| before_election = John Breaux
| before_party = Democratic Party (United States)
| after_election = David Vitter
| after_party = Republican Party (United States)
}}

The 2004 United States Senate election in Louisiana' was held on November 2, 2004. Incumbent Democratic Senator John Breaux decided to retire after three terms in office. Republican Representative David Vitter won the open seat with 51% of the primary vote and avoided a runoff, which would be scheduled on December 4, becoming the first Republican elected to the senate in over 100 years and the first Republican ever to be popularly elected to the U.S. Senate from Louisiana.

 Candidates 
 Democratic Party 
 Chris John, U.S. Representative
 John Neely Kennedy, State Treasurer
 Arthur A. Morrell
 Sam Houston Melton, Jr.

 Republican Party 
 David Vitter, U.S. Representative

 Independents 
 Richard M. Fontanesi
 R.A. "Skip" Galan

 Campaign 
Breaux, considered the most popular politician in Louisiana, endorsed Chris John prior to the jungle primary.

During the campaign, Vitter was accused by a member of the Louisiana Republican State Central Committee of having had a lengthy affair with a prostitute in New Orleans. Vitter responded that the allegation was "absolutely and completely untrue" and that it was "just crass Louisiana politics." The allegation later turned out to be true.

Vitter won the Louisiana jungle primary with 51% of the vote, avoiding the need for a runoff. John received 29.2% of the vote and Kennedy (no relation to the Massachusetts Kennedys), took 14.9%.

Vitter won at least a plurality in 55 of Louisiana's 64 parishes. John carried nine parishes, all but two of which (Iberville and Orleans) are part of the House district he represented.

Kennedy changed parties and unsuccessfully ran as Republican in 2008 against Louisiana's senior Senator, Democrat Mary Landrieu, but he was elected to the U.S. Senate in 2016 upon Vitter's retirement.

Vitter was the first Republican in Louisiana to be popularly elected as a U.S. Senator. The previous Republican Senator, William Pitt Kellogg, was chosen by the state legislature in 1876, in accordance with the process used before the Seventeenth Amendment to the United States Constitution went into effect in 1914.

 Predictions 

 Results 

 Aftermath 
Vitter won reelection in 2010 in spite of allegations surrounding solicitations of prostitutes. He then ran for Governor of Louisiana in 2015, but lost to Democrat John Bel Edwards. After conceding defeat in the gubernatorial election, Vitter announced that he would not run for a third term in 2016. However, the open seat was won by John Neely Kennedy, the second losing Democratic candidate from the 2004 race. In the interim, Kennedy had switched to the Republican Party and unsuccessfully challenged Democratic U.S. Senator Mary Landrieu in 2008.

 See also 
 2004 United States Senate elections

 References 

 External links 
 Elections Division from the Louisiana Secretary of State''

2004 Louisiana elections
Louisiana
2004